Puerto Cabezas Airport  is an airport serving Puerto Cabezas, North Caribbean Coast Autonomous Region. It is located approximately one hour from Managua by aircraft. Operated by the state of Nicaragua, it mainly serves the city of Puerto Cabezas and Bluefields located close to the northeast corner of the country.

Improvement plans
There are plans to make the airport an international airport. The Airport Management Authority of Nicaragua has drawn up plans for improving the paved areas, taxiways, ramps and an air terminal.

The terminal facilities are modern and air-conditioned. Immigration and customs services are also provided, but must be coordinated by respective authorities.

Transport links
The airport is approximately one kilometre north of the city center, and there are taxis, buses, and other forms of transportation available.

Airlines and destinations
The terminal provides services for daily regular flights by airline Avianca Nicaragua as well as for charter flights (air taxis) to Managua and other airports on the Caribbean coast. The terminal operates during daytime only.

See also

Transport in Nicaragua
List of airports in Nicaragua

References

External links

Airports in Nicaragua
North Caribbean Coast Autonomous Region